The 1989–90 Midland Football Combination season was the 53rd in the history of Midland Football Combination, a football competition in England.

Premier Division

The Premier Division featured 16 clubs which competed in the division last season, along with four new clubs:
Bloxwich, promoted from Division One, who also changed name to Bloxwich Town
Mile Oak Rovers, relegated from the Southern Football League
Stapenhill, joined from the Leicestershire Senior League
Streetly Celtic, promoted from Division One

League table

References

1989–90
8